The Catholic Church is "the Catholic Communion of Churches, both Roman and Eastern, or Oriental, that are in full communion with the Bishop of Rome (the pope)." The church is also known by members as the People of God, the Body of Christ, the "Temple of the Holy Spirit", among other names. According to Vatican II's , the "church has but one sole purpose–that the kingdom of God may come and the salvation of the human race may be accomplished."

This communion of churches comprises the Latin Church (or the Roman or Western Church) as well as 23 Eastern Catholic Churches, canonically called sui juris churches, each led by either a patriarch or a major archbishop in full communion with the Bishop of Rome. Historically, these bodies separated from Eastern Christian communions, either to remain in or to return to full communion with the Catholic Church. Vatican II decree on Eastern Catholic Churches, however, explicitly recognizes Eastern Catholic communities as "true Churches" and not just rites within the Catholic Church. This Communion of Churches "exists among and between the individual Churches and dioceses of the universal Catholic Church. Its structural expression is the College of Bishops, each of whom represents and embodies his own local church." In addition to Eastern Catholic Churches, the Catholic Church oversees the Catholic Charismatic renewal, the largest Charismatic movement of a single institution in 2020, with over 100 million members, primarily in the Global South.  The Catholic Church is also described as an "amalgam of parts" (i.e., thousands of individual dioceses, religious orders, etc.) globally dispersed, but in communion with Rome.   

The Catholic Church is the "world's oldest continuously functioning international institution." It is also the largest non-government provider of education and health care in the world, while the diplomatic status of the Holy See facilitates the access of its vast international network of charities. Some of these entities include 5,000 hospitals, 10,000 orphanages, 95,000 elementary schools and 47,000 secondary schools.

Methodology
Most of the figures are taken from the CIA Factbook or PEW Research Center Surveys. In Latin American countries, Latinobarometro is often cited. In Germany and other German speaking regions of Europe, there are official membership statistics due to the fact that the government collects a church tax based on these membership lists. One's baptismal certificate or any other religious document is secondary to church statistics. This method might explain the discrepancy between Pew's figures on Germany and the church figures.

According to the CIA Factbook and the Pew Research Center, the five countries with the largest number of Catholics are, in decreasing order of Catholic population :

  Brazil
  Mexico
  Philippines
  United States 
  Italy

The country where the membership of the church is the largest percentage of the population is Vatican City at 100%, followed by East Timor at 97%.

According to the Census of the 2020 Annuario Pontificio (Pontifical Yearbook), the number of baptized Catholics in the world was about 1.329 billion at the end of 2018.  The research initiative Catholics & Cultures compiles data on Catholic demographics, including from the Annuario Pontificio, by country.

Conflicting numbers can be found in 2013 research conducted by the Brazilian polling institute Datafolha. This report states that the percentage of the population in Brazil of Catholic religion, over the age of 16 years, is just 57%, in contrast to the 64.63% published by CIA and to the 68.6% of Pew Research Center. Also, the 2010 Mexican Census showed this percentage to be 83.9%against a 91.89% number in the CIA World Factbook.

By country
By clicking on the icons in the column titles, the table can be re-ordered by column.

By dependent territory

By region
These percentages were calculated by using the above numbers. The first percentage, 4th column, is the percentage of population that is Catholic in a region (number in the region x 100 / total population of the region). The last column shows the national Catholic percentage compared to the total Catholic population of the world (number in the region x 100 / total RC population of the world).

Africa

Americas

Asia

Europe

Middle East

Oceania

See also

 The term Roman Catholic
 
 Christianity by country
 List of Catholic archdioceses (by country and continent)
 List of Catholic dioceses (alphabetical) (including archdioceses)
 List of Catholic dioceses (structured view) (including archdioceses)
 List of Christian denominations by number of members
 List of living cardinals (sortable by name, country, and birthdate)
 List of popes
 List of religious populations
 State religion#Roman Catholicism
 Eastern Catholic Churches

References

External links